Gomphocerippus is a genus of Palearctic grasshoppers belonging to the tribe Gomphocerini.

Species
The Orthoptera Species File lists:
 Gomphocerippus longipennis Li & Ren, 2016
 Gomphocerippus rufus (Linnaeus, 1758) - type species

References 

 Fauna Europaea 
 Biolib

Acrididae genera
Gomphocerinae
Taxa named by H. Radclyffe Roberts